The Kerry Senior Football Championship (known for sponsorship reasons as Garvey’s SuperValu Senior Football Championship) is an annual Gaelic football competition organised by the Kerry County Board of the Gaelic Athletic Association since 1889 for the top Gaelic football teams in the county of Kerry in Ireland.

The series of games are played during the summer and autumn months, with the county final currently being played in either Austin Stack Park or FitzGerald Stadium in October. Initially played as a knock-out competition, the championship currently uses a double elimination format whereby each team is guaranteed at least two games.

The Kerry County Championship is an integral part of the wider Munster Senior Club Football Championship. The winners of the Kerry county final join the champion clubs of the other five counties to contest the provincial championship. The winning team of the county championship also has the honour of naming the captain of the Kerry senior team for the following year.

The title has been won at least once by 22 different teams. The all-time record-holders are Austin Stacks and  Dr. Crokes who have both won a total of 13 titles.

East Kerry are the title-holders after defeating Mid Kerry in the 2022 championship final.

Participating teams

2023 Teams

Clubs eligible for divisional team

Wins listed by Club

Finals listed by year

1880s
 1889 Laune Rangers 0–06 beat Killarney Crokes 0–03

1890s
 1890 Laune Rangers 1–04 beat Tralee Mitchels 0–01
 1891 Ballymacelligott 1–08 beat Keel 0–01
 1892 Laune Rangers 3–07 beat Ballymacelligott 1–07
 1893 Laune Rangers 1–01 beat Keel 0–02
 1894 Ballymacelligott beat Irremore (W/O)
 1895 Ballymacelligott
 1896 Caherciveen, Tralee Mitchels  (Shared)
 1897 Irremore beat Tralee Mitchells
 1898
 1899

1900s
 1900 Laune Rangers 3-04 beat Killarney Crokes 0-03
 1901 Killarney Crokes 1-02 beat Caherciveen 0-02
 1902 Tralee Mitchels Awarded
 1903 Tralee Mitchels beat Kilcummin W/O
 1904 Tralee Mitchels W/O Caherciveen 
 1905 Tralee Mitchels W/O Caherciveen
 1906 Not played
 1907 Tralee Mitchels 0-11 beat Lispole 0-01
 1908 Tralee Mitchels 0-08 beat Dingle Gascons 0-04
 1909 Combined with 1910 championship

1910s
 1910 Tralee Mitchels 3–04 beat Laune Rangers 0–04
 1911 Laune Rangers 1–03 beat Tralee Mitchels 1–01
 1912 Killarney Crokes 1–06 beat Tralee Mitchels 0–00
 1913 Killarney Crokes 3–01 beat Kilcummin 1–00
 1914 Killarney Crokes 1–02 beat Tralee Mitchels 1–00
 1915 Not played
 1916 Not finished
 1917 Tralee Mitchels beat Farranfore
 1918 Ballymacelligott beat Farranfore
 1919 Tralee Mitchels 3–03 beat Dingle Gascons 2–02

1920s
 1920 Championship not finished.
 1921 Championship was not played.
 1922 Championship was not played.
 1923 Championship not finished.
 1924 Championship was not played.
 1925 Tralee Division 1–05 beat Listowel Selection 0–04
 1926 Tralee Division 7–07 beat Listowel Selection 2–01
 1927 Tralee Division beat North Kerry
 1928 Austin Stacks 3–04 beat Kerins O'Rahilly's 0–07 
 1929 John Mitchels 3–04 beat Austin Stacks 0–04

1930s
 1930 Austin Stacks 4–04 beat Kerins O'Rahilly's 2–05
 1931 Austin Stacks 2–07 beat John Mitchels 1–03
 1932 Austin Stacks 2–03 beat North Kerry 1–05
 1933 Kerins O'Rahilly's 5–5 beat Austin Stacks 0–05
 1934 
 1935 
 1936 Austin Stacks 0–06 beat Kerins O'Rahilly's 0–04
 1937 John Mitchels beat Dingle
 1938 Dingle 3–03 North Kerry 2–05
 1939 Kerins O'Rahilly's 2–08 beat Dingle 1–03

1940s
 1940 Dingle beat Kerins O'Rahilly's
 1941 Dingle 3–06 beat John Mitchels 2–00
 1942 Shannon Rangers 2–04 beat John Mitchels 1–03
 1943 Dingle 3–06 beat Castleisland 2–02
 1944 Dingle 1–03 beat Castleisland 0–04
 1945 Shannon Rangers 1–07 beat Killarney Legion 0–05
 1946 Killarney Legion 0–07 beat John Mitchels 0–05
 1947 John Mitchels 2–05 defeated Dingle 0–09
 1948 Dingle 2–10 beat Shannon Rangers 0–05
 1949 Killarney 2–07 beat John Mitchels 2–03

1950s
 1950 Castleisland beat Killarney (R)
 1951 Dick Fitzgeralds 1–07 John Mitchels 0–03
 1952 John Mitchels 3–06 beat Kenmare 0–06
 1953 Kerins O'Rahilly's 1–04 beat Shannon Rangers 0–05
 1954 Kerins O'Rahilly's 2–01 beat Kenmare 1–02
 1955 South Kerry 2–05 beat Shannon Rangers 0–09 (replay) 
 1956 South Kerry 1–11 defeated Kerins O'Rahilly's 0–10
 1957 Kerins O'Rahilly's 1–11 beat St Brendan's 3–01
 1958 South Kerry 1–13 beat St Brendan's 1–05
 1959 John Mitchels 3–09 beat Feale Rangers 1–10 (R)

1960s
 1960 John Mitchels 1–11 beat West Kerry 0–03 (R)
 1961 John Mitchels 2–09 beat Kerins O'Rahilly's 0–08
 1962 John Mitchels 1–09 beat Feale Rangers 0–05 (R)
 1963 John Mitchels 4–04 beat Kerins O'Rahilly's 2–03
 1964 Shannon Rangers 1–10 beat East Kerry 1–05
 1965 East Kerry 0–10 beat Mid Kerry 0–04 (R)
 1966 John Mitchels 2–10 beat East Kerry 1–10
 1967 Mid Kerry 0–12 beat West Kerry 2–04 
 1968 East Kerry 6–08 beat Waterville 1–09
 1969 East Kerry 2–07 beat Waterville 1–08

1970s
 1970 East Kerry 1–15 beat Waterville 0–15
 1971 Mid Kerry 0–12 beat Shannon Rangers 1–06 (R)
 1972 Shannon Rangers 2–08 beat Mid Kerry 1–07
 1973 Austin Stacks 2–08 beat West Kerry 1–06
 1974 Kenmare 2–12 beat Shannon Rangers 1–05
 1975 Austin Stacks 1-07 beat Mid Kerry 1–04
 1976 Austin Stacks 1–14 beat Kenmare 0–07
 1977 Shannon Rangers 0–10 beat Feale Rangers 0–06
 1978 Feale Rangers 0–08 beat Mid Kerry 0–03
 1979 Austin Stacks 1–11 beat Castleisland 0–09

1980s
 1980 Feale Rangers 1–10 beat Austin Stacks 1–07
 1981 South Kerry 1–12 beat Austin Stacks 0–11
 1982 South Kerry 0–07 beat Feale Rangers 0–05
 1983 Killarney beat Feale Rangers
 1984 West Kerry beat South Kerry
 1985 West Kerry 0–11 beat Feale Rangers 1–05
 1986 Austin Stacks 1–11 beat Killarney 1–07
 1987 Kenmare 3–10 beat Dr Crokes 0–18 (R)
 1988 St Kieran's 0–10 beat Dr Crokes 0–03
 1989 Laune Rangers 2–13 beat John Mitchels 1–06

1990s
 1990 West Kerry 4–09 beat Mid Kerry 0–07
 1991 Dr Crokes 2–10 beat Castleisland Desmonds 1–10
 1992 Mid Kerry 3–09 beat St. Brendan's 1-10
 1993 Laune Rangers 1–15 beat Annascaul 1–08
 1994 Austin Stacks 0–12 beat Dr. Crokes 1–05 (Replay)
 1995 Laune Rangers 1–07 beat East Kerry 0–06
 1996 Laune Rangers 2–07 beat West Kerry 1–09
 1997 East Kerry 1–11 beat Laune Rangers 0–08 (Replay)
 1998 East Kerry 2–13 beat St Kieran's, Castleisland 1–10
 1999 East Kerry 0–10 beat Feale Rangers 1–06

2000s
 2000 Dr Crokes 1–04 beat An Ghaeltacht 0–06
 2001 An Ghaeltacht 1–13 beat Austin Stacks 0–10
 2002 Kerins O'Rahilly's 0–14 beat Kilcummin 0–05
 2003 An Ghaeltacht 0–12 beat Laune Rangers 2–04 (Replay)
 2004 South Kerry 1–13 beat Laune Rangers 2–05
 2005 South Kerry 0–12 beat Dr Crokes 1–06
 2006 South Kerry 0–12 beat Dr Crokes 1–08
 2007 Feale Rangers 1–04 beat South Kerry 0–06
 2008 Mid Kerry 1–07 beat Kerins O'Rahilly's 0–09 (Replay)
 2009 South Kerry 1–08 beat Dr Crokes 0–10

2010s

2020s
 2020 East Kerry 2-15 beat Mid Kerry 0-09 
2021 Austin Stacks 0-13 beat Kerins O'Rahillys 0-10
2022 East Kerry 1-16 beat  Mid Kerry 0-10

Records and statistics

Teams

By decade
The most successful team of each decade, judged by number of Kerry Senior Football Championship titles, is as follows:
 1880s: 1 for Laune Rangers (1889)
 1890s: 3 each for Laune Rangers (1890-92-93) and Ballymacelligott (1891-94-95)
 1900s: 4 for Tralee Mitchels (1902-03-07-08)
 1910s: 3 each for Tralee Mitchels (1910-17-19) and Dr Crokes (1912-13-14)
 1920s: 3 for Tralee Division (1925-26-27)
 1930s: 4 for Austin Stacks (1930-31-32-36)
 1940s: 5 for Dingle (1940-41-43-44-48)
 1950s: 3 each for Kerins O'Rahilly's (1953-54-57) and South Kerry (1955-56-58)
 1960s: 5 for John Mitchels (1960-61-62-63-66)
 1970s: 4 for Austin Stacks (1973-75-76-79)
 1980s: 2 each for South Kerry (1981-82) and West Kerry (1984-85)
 1990s: 3 each for Laune Rangers (1993-95-96) and East Kerry (1997-98-99)
 2000s: 4 for South Kerry (2004-05-06-09)
 2010s: 7 for Dr Crokes (2010-11-12-13-16-17-18)
 2020s: 2 for East Kerry (2020-22)

Gaps
Top ten longest gaps between successive championship titles:
 78 years: Laune Rangers (1911-1989)
 77 years: Dr Crokes (1914-1991)
 45 years: Kerins O'Rahilly's (1957-2002)
 37 years: Austin Stacks (1936-1973)
 34 years: Killarney (1949-1983)
 27 years: Feale Rangers (1980-2007)
 27 years: East Kerry (1970-1997)
 23 years: Ballymacelligott (1895-1918)
 23 years: South Kerry (1958-1981)
 22 years: South Kerry (1982-2004)

References

 
Gaelic football competitions in County Kerry
Senior Gaelic football county championships